A Waiter-Client game (also called: Picker-Chooser game) is a kind of positional game. Like most positional games, it is described by its set of positions/points/elements, and its family of winning-sets (- a  family of subsets of ). It is played by two players, called Waiter and Client. Each round, Waiter picks two elements, Client chooses one element and Waiter gets the other element (similarly to the Divide and choose protocol). 

In a Waiter-Client game, Waiter wins if he manages to occupy all the elements of a winning-set, while Client wins if he manages to prevent this, i.e., hold at least one element in each winning-set. So Waiter and Client have, respectively, the same goals as Maker and Breaker in a Maker-Breaker game; only the rules for taking elements are different.

In a Client-Waiter game the winning conditions are reversed: Client wins if he manages to hold all the elements of a winning-set, while Waiter wins if he manages to hold at least one element in each winning-set.

Comparison to Maker-Breaker games 
In some cases, the Waiter is much more powerful than the player with the same goal in the Maker-Breaker variant. For example, consider a variant of tic-tac-toe in which Maker wins by taking k squares in a row and Breaker wins by blocking all rows. 

Then, when the board is infinite, Waiter can win as Maker for any k >= 1. Moreover, Waiter can win as Breaker for any k >= 2: in each round, Waiter picks a pair of squares that are not adjacent to the pairs picked so far (for example, in round i he picks the squares (2i,0) and (2i,1)). Moreover, even when the board is finite, Waiter always wins as Breaker when k >= 8.   

Special cases

k-uniform hypergraphs 
Suppose the winning-sets are all of size k (i.e., the game-hypergraph is  k-uniform).

However, currently only the following weaker bounds are known:

References 

Positional games